MaCio Teague (born June 11, 1997) is an American professional basketball player for the Baskets Oldenburg of the Basketball Bundesliga. He played college basketball for the UNC Asheville Bulldogs and the Baylor Bears.

High school career
As a sophomore at Summit Country Day School in Cincinnati, Ohio, Teague averaged 14.2 points per game. For his junior season, he transferred to Walnut Hills High School in Cincinnati, where he averaged 22.4 points per game in his first year. On January 19, 2015, as a senior, Teague scored a school-record 51 points in a 96–48 win over Piqua High School at the Flyin' to the Hoop Invitational. He scored the second-most single-game points in the event's history, behind only Byron Mullens. Teague finished the season averaging 26.4 points and 7.5 rebounds per game, leading the Ohio Division I in scoring. He was named Eastern Cincinnati Conference and District 16 Player of the Year, while earning Second Team All-State honors. Teague played a postgraduate season at Montverde Academy in Montverde, Florida to further develop and to gain more exposure.

College career

UNC Asheville
On February 11, 2017, Teague scored a freshman season-high 30 points for UNC Asheville in a 91–69 win over Longwood. As a freshman, he averaged 15.4 points, 4.6 rebounds and 2.7 assists per game and was named Big South Freshman of the Year while earning First Team All-Big South honors. Teague became the seventh player in conference history to record at least 500 points in his freshman season. On February 1, 2018, he scored a career-high 36 points and made seven three-pointers in a 64–57 victory over Campbell. As a sophomore, Teague averaged 16.7 points, 4.4 rebounds, 2.5 assists and 1.6 steals per game, leading the Big South by shooting 42.5 percent from three-point range. He was named to the First Team All-Big South for his second consecutive year. After the season, he received his release to transfer from UNC Asheville.

Baylor
On April 30, 2018, Teague announced that he would continue his college career with Baylor over offers from Louisville, Virginia and Xavier. He sat out the following season due to National Collegiate Athletic Association transfer rules and was a member of the team's practice squad. He made his debut for Baylor on November 5, 2019, scoring 18 points and collecting 10 rebounds in a 105–61 win over Central Arkansas. On February 8, 2020, Teague scored a junior season-high 24 points, including six straight free throws in the final 14 seconds, in a 78–70 win over Oklahoma State. As a junior, he averaged 13.9 points and 4.6 rebounds in a team-high 32.6 minutes per game, helping Baylor achieve a 26–4 record. Teague was named to the Second Team All-Big 12 and was a unanimous Big 12 All-Newcomer Team selection. After the season, he declared for the 2020 NBA draft, before withdrawing and returning to Baylor. On March 7, 2021, Teague scored 35 points, shooting 10-of-12 from three-point range, in an 88–73 win over Texas Tech. His 10 three-pointers tied for the most in program history and the second-most in Big 12 history. Baylor entered the 2021 NCAA tournament with a 1-seed and went on to win the national championship, finishing with a 28-2 record. In the tournament, Teague averaged nearly 15 points per game, including 22 points in the opening round against Hartford and the regional final against Arkansas, both of which led the team, and 19 points in the championship game victory over Gonzaga. He averaged 15.9 points and 4.0 rebounds per game on the season.

Professional career
After going undrafted in the 2021 NBA draft, Teague signed with the Utah Jazz on August 15, 2021. He was waived prior to the start of the season. In October 2021, Teague joined the Salt Lake City Stars as an affiliate player. However, he was waived on March 22, 2022 after suffering a season-ending injury.

On July 29, 2022, Teague signed a contract with Baskets Oldenburg of the Basketball Bundesliga.

Career statistics

College

|-
| style="text-align:left;"| 2016–17
| style="text-align:left;"| UNC Asheville
| 33 || 32 || 34.1 || .468 || .455 || .886 || 4.6 || 2.7 || 1.1 || .2 || 15.4
|-
| style="text-align:left;"| 2017–18
| style="text-align:left;"| UNC Asheville
| 34 || 32 || 35.3 || .418 || .425 || .866 || 4.4 || 2.5 || 1.6 || .1 || 16.7
|-
| style="text-align:left;"| 2018–19
| style="text-align:left;"| Baylor
| style="text-align:center;" colspan="11"|  Redshirt
|-
| style="text-align:left;"| 2019–20
| style="text-align:left;"| Baylor
| 28 || 28 || 32.6 || .400 || .355 || .848 || 4.6 || 1.9 || 1.0 || .2 || 13.9
|-
| style="text-align:left;"| 2020–21
| style="text-align:left;"| Baylor
| 30 || 30 || 31.7 || .478 || .395 || .827 || 4.0 || 1.7 || .8 || .4 || 15.8
|- class="sortbottom"
| style="text-align:center;" colspan="2"| Career
| 125 || 122 || 33.5 || .442 || .408 || .860 || 4.4 || 2.2 || 1.1 || .2 || 15.5

References

External links
Baylor Bears bio
UNC Asheville Bulldogs bio

1997 births
Living people
American men's basketball players
Basketball players from Cincinnati
Baylor Bears men's basketball players
EWE Baskets Oldenburg players
Montverde Academy alumni
Salt Lake City Stars players
Shooting guards
UNC Asheville Bulldogs men's basketball players